Kampung Sabang is a settlement in the Simunjan division of Sarawak, Malaysia.

Neighbouring settlements include:

References

Sabang